Drumry railway station serves the Drumry and Linnvale area of Clydebank, West Dunbartonshire, Scotland. The railway station is managed by ScotRail and is served by trains on the Argyle Line and North Clyde Line.

Drumry station was opened in 1953 to serve two of the new housing schemes that were built post World War II on the northern edges of the Burgh of Clydebank. To the north of the line is the area known as South Drumry and to the south of the line is the area of Linnvale which is bounded by the Great Western Road to the east, the railway line to the north and the Forth and Clyde Canal to the south.

Facilities

The station has car parking facilities, and has ten cycle stands available.  It is staffed from Monday to Saturday.

Work to replace the platform surfaces will start in January 2022, and is expected to continue until June.

Services

There is a basic 15-minute service frequency in each direction throughout the day (Mon-Sat), provided by North Clyde Line and Argyle Line services. On Sundays, there is a half-hourly service each way, provide by the Edinburgh to  trains.

References

Sources
 
 

Railway stations in West Dunbartonshire
Railway stations opened by British Rail
Railway stations in Great Britain opened in 1953
SPT railway stations
Railway stations served by ScotRail
Clydebank